The Congress of Soummam was the founding act of the modern Algerian State, and a crucial element of success of the Algerian war for independence. It took place on 20 August 1956 when the FLN's leadership within Algeria met secretly in the Soummam valley (Ighbane and Ifri at Ouzellaguen) to compose a common platform and create a new organizational structure.

The Soummam platform 
The Soummam platform reaffirmed the international strategy first outlined by Aït Ahmed. Rather than a military victory, it looked for "the total weakening of the French army to make victory by arms impossible." In the process, the FLN would establish their bona fides as Algeria's legitimate government and adhere to international law. To that end, the Congress of Soummam formed a five-man Comité de Coordination et d'Exécution (CCE) consisting of Abane Ramdane, Ben M'hidi, Krim Belkacem, Benyoucef Benkhedda and Saad Dahlab —the last two formerly Central Committee members of the MTLD. A larger Conseil National de la Révolution Algérienne (CNRA) would serve as the supreme authority. In the meantime, the FLN intended to engineer such social and economic disruption in the metropole and Algeria as to make it impossible for France to continue the war. Equally important, it would work for "the political isolation of France—in Algeria and in the world.

The three guiding principles of the FLN were codified: the primacy of the political over the military; the primacy of the interior over Exterior; and the concept of collective leadership at all echelons. Measures to increase support among the Algerian population and to eliminate opposing groups were adopted, and terms were laid down for any future peace negotiations with the French, including the very important provision that there should be no cease-fire before the French recognized Algerian independence. The negotiating points adopted at Soummam were subsequently adhered to without modification until independence was achieved in 1962.

Titular members 
The National Council of the Algerian Revolution, designed after the conference was composed of 34 members: 17 titular, and 17 alternates.

 Mostefa Ben Boulaïd
 Youssef Zighout
 Belkacem Krim
 Amar Ouamrane
 Larbi Ben M’Hidi
 Rabah Bitat
 Mohamed Boudiaf
 Ramdane Abane
 Ahmed Ben Bella
 Mohamed Khider
 Hocine Aït Ahmed
 Med Lamine Debaghine
 Idir Aïssat
 Ferhat Abbas
 M’hamed Yazid
 Benyoucef Ben Khedda
 Taoufik El Madani

Alternate members 
 Ben Boulaïd's Assistant
 Lakhdar Ben Tobbal
 Saïd Mohammedi
 Slimane Déhilès
 Abdelhafid Boussouf
 Ali Mellah
 Saâd Dahlab
 Salah Louanchi
 Mohammed Ben Yahia
 Abdelhamid Mehri
 Tayeb Thaâlibi
 Mohammed Lebdjaoui
 Ahmed Francis
 Aïssa Ben Atallah
 UGTA 
 Brahim Mezhoudi
 Abdel-Malek Temmam

References

Algerian War
1956 in Algeria
1956 conferences